Carlos Andres Cortes (born June 30, 1997) is an American professional baseball second baseman in the New York Mets organization.

Amateur career
Cortes attended Lake Howell High School in Winter Park, Florida. Cortes was drafted by the New York Mets in the 20th round of the 2016 Major League Baseball draft but did not sign. He attended the University of South Carolina for two seasons (2017 and 2018) and played college baseball for the Gamecocks. In 2017, he played collegiate summer baseball in the Cape Cod Baseball League for the Yarmouth-Dennis Red Sox.

Cortes hit .265 with 15 home runs and 44 RBIs his sophomore season in 2018 for the Gamecocks, and was ranked the 177th best prospect by Baseball America in the upcoming. He was selected by the Mets in the third round of the 2018 Major League Baseball draft, and signed with them for a reported $1 million signing bonus on June 25, 2018.

Professional career
Cortes made his professional debut for the Brooklyn Cyclones, hitting .264/.338/.382 with four home runs and 24 RBIs. He spent the 2019 season with the St. Lucie Mets. Over 127 games, he slashed .255/.336/.397 with 11 home runs, 68 RBIs, and 26 doubles. He did not play a game in 2020 due to the cancellation of the minor league season. Instead, he played in the Australian Baseball League for the Sydney Blue Sox that winter.

Cortes spent the 2021 season with the Binghamton Rumble Ponies where he batted .257 with 14 home runs and 57 RBIs over 79 games.

References

External links

Carolina Gamecocks bio

1997 births
Living people
Baseball players from Orlando, Florida
Baseball second basemen
South Carolina Gamecocks baseball players
Brooklyn Cyclones players
St. Lucie Mets players
Yarmouth–Dennis Red Sox players
American expatriate baseball players in Australia
Sydney Blue Sox players
Binghamton Rumble Ponies players
Indios de Mayagüez players